The Grand Bénare is a volcanic peak on the island of Réunion, located in the Western part of the island, overlooking the "Cirque de Mafate" and "Cirque de Cilaos".
It is the third highest peak on the island, after the Piton des Neiges and the Gros Morne.

Mountains of Réunion

It is most often accessed by hike from the Maido in the heights of Saint Paul.